The shortlisted nominees for the 2020 Governor General's Awards for Literary Merit were announced on May 4, 2021, and the winners were announced on June 1. Ordinarily the award shortlists and winners would have been named in fall 2020, but were delayed due to the COVID-19 pandemic in Canada.

English

French

References

External links
Governor General's Awards

Governor General's Awards
Governor General's Awards
Governor General's Awards